William Robinson (September 18, 1794 – May 13, 1864) was an American slave holder and benefactor of the Robinson Female Seminary in Exeter, New Hampshire, and the Summerville Academy in Augusta, Georgia's historic district of Summerville.

Early life and education
William Robinson was born at a house on Main Street at Exeter, New Hampshire, September 18, 1794, and here his early life was passed. While yet a child, his parents died, and he was left, without property, to make his own way in the world as best he could.

He attended Phillips Exeter Academy.

Career
Robinson was apprenticed to the printer's trade early in life, and followed it for a time. He then left Exeter for the South, and finally settled in Augusta, Georgia, where he entered into business and enjoyed a successful career. 

He lived the rest of his life in Augusta, and this is where the largest part of his property was accumulated. Having amassed a large fortune, the most of which he carefully invested in the North, and proposing to spend some time in travel in Europe, Robinson made his will in the year 1853, in which, after legacies to his wife and relatives (he had no children), he left the bulk of his property to an institution in Georgia, and to found a seminary for girls in his native town.

The Civil War broke out soon after and Robinson's travel abroad never occurred. At the time of his death, it was supposed that Robinson was, in a measure, unacquainted with the extent of his own fortune. However, he seems to have changed his purpose just before he died, so far as to propose leaving a comparatively limited bequest for the founding of a seminary in his native town, and a new will was drawn up to that effect, but he died before it could be executed.

Death and legacy
William Robinson died at Summerville, Georgia, May 13, 1864.

Robinson Female Seminary was established in 1867 in Exeter; it closed in 1955. 

A monument erected over his remains at Augusta, has this inscription:—

WILLIAM ROBINSON
Born in 
Exeter, N. H., 
September 18, 1794. 

Died at 
Summerville, Ga., 
May 13, 1864. 
A resident of Augusta and vicinity for nearly fifty years, he was known as a courteous gentleman, an honorable merchant, and a benefactor to the poor. His name will be held in grateful remembrance by the people of his birthplace and of his adopted home, for the bounty which secured to their children, and children's children, the priceless benefits of education.

References

Further reading
 William Robinson and the School be Founded: Commemorating the 100th Anniversary of Robinson Female Seminary, 1967

1794 births
1864 deaths
People from Exeter, New Hampshire
School founders
American philanthropists
Phillips Exeter Academy alumni